Joseph Hudson Turner (1872 – 8 February 1937) was a Welsh international footballer. He was part of the Wales national football team, playing 1 match on 5 March 1892 against England. At club level. he played for Wrexham.

See also
 List of Wales international footballers (alphabetical)

References

1872 births
1937 deaths
Welsh footballers
Wales international footballers
Wrexham A.F.C. players
Association footballers not categorized by position